Coffee, Do Me a Favor is a 2018 South Korean television series starring Yong Jun-hyung, Kim Min-young and Chae Seo-jin. It premiered on December 1, 2018 and airs on Channel A's Saturdays and Sundays at 19:40 KST time slot.

Synopsis
It tells the story of an overweight woman who, after sipping on a cup of magic coffee, becomes a beauty; and a handsome man who doesn't believe in love.

Cast

Main
 Yong Jun-hyung as Im Hyun-woo
A webtoon writer who doesn't believe in love.
 Chae Seo-jin as Oh Go-woon
 A beautiful woman whom Seul-bi transformed into after drinking a magic coffee.
 Kim Min-young as Lee Seul-bi
 Hyun-woo's assistant / trainee who has a crush on him.

Supporting
Jung Da-eun as Jang So-myung
Lee Tae-ri as Moon Jung-won
Gil Eun-hye as Kang Ye-na
Ryu Hye-rin as Park A-reum
Han Je-hoo as Jung Sook
Maeng Se-chang as Lee Dong-goo
Kim Neul-mae as Cafe Owner

References

External links
  
 
 

Channel A television dramas
Korean-language television shows
2018 South Korean television series debuts

South Korean romance television series
South Korean romantic comedy television series
South Korean fantasy television series
Body image in popular culture